The John M. Reeves Student Recreation Center is a sports facility located in Hackettstown, New Jersey. It is within the campus of Centenary University and is the home of the Centenary University Cyclones, and the Jersey Express of the American Basketball Association (ABA). The school made an expansion and renovation worth $5 million in January 2007. The expanded athletic facility includes a 1,200 seat gymnasium with two full-sized multi-purpose courts, a swimming pool, indoor batting cages, and other amenities.

References

External links
John M. Reeves Student Recreation Center official website

Centenary University
College basketball venues in the United States
University and college student recreation centers in the United States